The Duke Ellington Fellowship Program is a community-based organization which sponsors artists mentoring and performing with Yale University students and young musicians from the New Haven public school system.

Community organizations
Duke Ellington
Education in Connecticut